The following is a list of events, births, and deaths in 1853 in Switzerland.

Incumbents 
Federal Council:
Ulrich Ochsenbein 
Jonas Furrer 
Josef Munzinger 
Henri Druey 
Friedrich Frey-Herosé
Wilhelm Matthias Naeff (President)
Stefano Franscini

Events 
 February 4 – Johann Jakob Speiser, Achilles Bischoff, and Karl Geigy establish the Swiss Central Railway
 Tissot, a Swiss watch company, is founded
 The Swiss Northern Railway merges with the Lake Constance and Rheinfall Railways to create the Swiss Northeastern Railway
 Revue Thommen is established under the name Waldenburg
 Diplomatic relations are established by the United States
 Grunerite is discovered and named after Emmanuel-Louis Gruner, the Swiss-French chemist who first analyzed it

Births 
 March 14 – Ferdinand Hodler, painter (d. 1918)
 September 14 – Marc-Émile Ruchet, French-speaking politician (d. 1912)
 December 11 – Jacob Wackernagel, linguist, Indo-Europeanist, and scholar of Sanskrit (d. 1938)
 Christian Klucker, mountain guide (d. 1928)
 Luigi Rossi, painter (d. 1923)

Deaths 
 September 15 – Théophile Voirol, general in the French Republican Army (b. 1781)
 November 28 – Hans Bendel, painter (b. 1814)

References 

 
Years of the 19th century in Switzerland